Luca Solari (born 2 October 1979 in Castel San Giovanni) is an Italian racing cyclist, who last rode for UCI Professional Continental team .

Palmarès 

2003
1st, Stage 4, Ster Elektrotoer
2007
1st, Grand Prix Pino Cerami

External links

Italian male cyclists
1979 births
Living people
Sportspeople from the Province of Piacenza
Cyclists from Emilia-Romagna